Trotski,  Trotskiy, Trotsky or Trotskiy may refer to:

Leon Trotsky (1879-1940), Jewish Russian revolutionary, Marxist theorist and Soviet politician
 Trotsky (surname)
Trotsky, a 2017 Russian biographical TV series by Alexander Kott
The Trotsky, a 2009 Canadian comedy film by Jacob Tierney
Trotsky (film), a 1993 Russian biographical film by Leonid Maryagin (Троцкий)
Trotsky Marudu (born 1953), Indian visual artist
Trotsky Vengarán, Uruguayan rock band

See also
 Trosky (disambiguation)
Troitsky (disambiguation)